The Cataract River, a perennial river that is part of the Hawkesbury-Nepean catchment, is located in the Macarthur region of New South Wales, Australia.

Course and features
The Cataract River rises on the western slopes of the Illawarra escarpment, west of Mount Pleasant, and flows generally north northwest, impounded within Lake Cataract, before reaching its confluence with the Nepean River at Douglas Park. The river descends  over its  course.

The river is a source of water for the Sydney region. Water is collected by the dams, weirs and aqueducts of the Upper Nepean Scheme.

See also 

 Rivers of New South Wales
 List of rivers of New South Wales (A–K)
 List of rivers of Australia
 Upper Nepean Scheme

References 

Macarthur (New South Wales)